Art of murder may refer to:
 
 
 

de:Kunst des Mordes